The 1976 Nice International Championships, was a men's tennis tournament played on outdoor clay courts at the Nice Lawn Tennis Club in Nice, France. It was a non-tour event, i.e. not part of the Grand Prix or World Championships Tennis circuits. It was the fifth edition of the tournament and was held from 4 April until 11 April 1976. Third-seeded Corrado Barazzutti won the title.

Finals

Singles
 Corrado Barazzutti defeated  Jan Kodeš	6–2, 2–6, 5–7, 7–6, 8–6
 It was Barazzutti's first singles title of his career.

Doubles
 Patrice Dominguez /  François Jauffret defeated  Wojciech Fibak /  Karl Meiler 6–4, 3–6, 6–3

References

External links
 ITF tournament edition details

Nice International Championships
1976
Nice International Championships
Nice International Championships
20th century in Nice